Newport is a town in Vermillion Township, Vermillion County, in the U.S. state of Indiana. The population was 515 at the 2010 census. The town is the county seat of Vermillion County.

History
A post office has been in operation at Newport since 1820. Newport was platted in 1828.

The Vermillion County Courthouse and Vermillion County Jail and Sheriff's Residence are listed on the National Register of Historic Places. Although the plutonium production plants at Hanford would eventually use graphite as a "moderator" to slow and control the fission process, Manhattan Project officials also pursued heavy water as an alternative option. A feasibility report conducted by the DuPont Company in November 1942 also rated heavy water as an acceptable cooling system, second best only to helium.

This information was brought to the attention of Harold Urey, a Manhattan Project scientist who had won the 1934 Nobel Prize in Chemistry for his discovery of deuterium, an isotope of hydrogen. Urey imagined a nuclear chain-reactor pile built as a “homogeneous” system with heavy water as both the moderator and cooler. It could function with a simple pump device, a much simpler design than the complex helium-cooled graphite pile. Urey believed such a pile could be built with only 10 tons of heavy water.

The Manhattan Project soon contracted DuPont to build heavy water plants at three sites where ordnance works were already under construction: the Morgantown Ordnance Works near Morgantown, West Virginia; at the Wabash River Ordnance Works, near Newport, Indiana; and at the Alabama Ordnance Works, near Sylacauga, Alabama. For security reasons, the plants had to be administered directly by Manhattan Project officials while the Ordnance Department was, according to Colonel James Marshall, “not to be involved in the design or knowledge of use of the product.” The three plants would collectively produce three tons of heavy water per month.

Construction at the Wabash River Ordnance Works started on January 23, 1943 and was fully completed on December 13, 1943. [6]

Geography
Newport is located at the confluence of the Little Vermilion and Wabash rivers along Indiana State Road 63, about halfway between the county's north and south borders.

Demographics

2010 census
As of the census of 2010, there were 515 people, 211 households, and 149 families living in the town. The racial makeup of the town was 99.8% White and 0.2% from two or more races.

There were 211 households, of which 29.9% had children under the age of 18 living with them, 53.1% were married couples living together, 12.8% had a female householder with no husband present, 4.7% had a male householder with no wife present, and 29.4% were non-families. 26.1% of all households were made up of individuals, and 13.2% had someone living alone who was 65 years of age or older. The average household size was 2.44 and the average family size was 2.93.

The median age in the town was 42.1 years. 23.3% of residents were under the age of 18; 8.9% were between the ages of 18 and 24; 21.2% were from 25 to 44; 28.9% were from 45 to 64; and 17.7% were 65 years of age or older. The gender makeup of the town was 49.3% male and 50.7% female.

2000 census
As of the census of 2000, there were 578 people, 237 households, and 162 families living in the town. The racial makeup of the town was 97.58% White, 0.35% Native American, 0.87% Asian, and 1.21% from two or more races. Hispanic or Latino of any race were 1.21% of the population.

There were 237 households, out of which 32.9% had children under the age of 18 living with them, 53.6% were married couples living together, 9.7% had a female householder with no husband present, and 31.6% were non-families. 27.8% of all households were made up of individuals, and 12.7% had someone living alone who was 65 years of age or older. The average household size was 2.44 and the average family size was 2.94.

In the town, the population was spread out, with 24.7% under the age of 18, 8.0% from 18 to 24, 29.1% from 25 to 44, 23.4% from 45 to 64, and 14.9% who were 65 years of age or older. The median age was 38 years. For every 100 females, there were 107.2 males. For every 100 females age 18 and over, there were 97.7 males.

The median income for a household in the town was $33,571, and the median income for a family was $36,389. Males had a median income of $36,518 versus $20,104 for females. The per capita income for the town was $16,771. About 5.9% of families and 9.1% of the population were below the poverty line, including 7.9% of those under age 18 and 9.5% of those age 65 or over.

Education
The town has a lending library, the Vermillion County Public Library.

Arts and culture
Each fall, specifically the first weekend in October, Newport is host to the Newport Antique Auto Hill Climb, a racing event in which antique vehicles ascend the town's 1800-foot-long, 140-foot-tall hill.  The popular event also features a car show, parade, and pageant. The Newport Antique Auto Hill Climb is an international event that attracts crowds of one hundred thousand plus to Newport. Automobiles, trucks and motorcycles from the Steam, Brass, Vintage, Antique, and Classic Car eras make timed runs from a standing start, up a steep hill to a finish line 1,800 feet away. It is an Indiana auto event third in size only to two annual Indianapolis Motor Speedway events, the Indianapolis 500 and Brickyard 400.

See also
 Newport Chemical Depot

References

External links
 Newport Antique Auto Hill Climb
 Atomic Heritage Foundation – Newport, IN
 

Towns in Indiana
Towns in Vermillion County, Indiana
County seats in Indiana
Terre Haute metropolitan area